Rivality was a massively multiplayer online browser-based strategy game developed by the Swedish gaming company FunRock. The game was available in nine different languages, including Swedish, Norwegian, English, Dutch, Danish, Finnish, Spanish, German and Bengali.

The game was programmed in ASP and runs in most modern browsers (such as Google Chrome, Firefox and Internet Explorer). Rivality could also be played on many newer smart-phones, but does not provide a separate mobile version. There was also a mobile app for Android available on Market, which allows the players to sell their oil, see base money and information etc.

Gameplay 
New players start out with a small land, in which he or she can start constructing a military base. There are several types of buildings available, such as Administration building, oil pump, oil refinery, barrack, factory, guard tower and more. The oil pumps are used to gather oil from the ground, which can be sold for money in the oil refinery. The money is used to produce units such as soldiers, tanks and aircraft. The units also have an upkeep cost, which means that the player must always keep money in the base to pay them, or they will leave. The units can be used for protection or be sent to attack enemy bases. They can also be used to reinforce other players' bases.

When advancing in the game, it is possible to produce engineers, which can be used to construct additional bases in the game. 50 engineers are required for each new base. The players can also conquer enemy bases by attacking them with a general. Each time a base is attacked by a general, the base administration building level will be reduced by one, provided that the general survives the attack. When or if the administration building has been destroyed, an attack with a general will conquer the base for the attacking player.

Alliances 
The game allows the players to cooperate, by forming alliances. Each alliance can consist of up to 25 players. The player who created the alliance will automatically become the alliance leader. He or she can then select one player to become alliance moderator, and one player as alliance recruiter. The moderator has the same powers as the alliance leader, except for disbanding the alliance. The recruiter can only recruit.
The alliance can provide the players with protection and resources, which can be vital for survival in the game.

End game 
Rivality is played in separate rounds, each round lasting at least 90 days. After that time, the end game is activated. Five computer controlled bases are randomly positioned in the game world. The player who first conquers and controls all five bases is announced as the round winner. Each endgame base is also equipped with a missile launcher, that the base owner can use to fire powerful missiles against enemy bases.

Rivality v3 
On 20 February 2012, FunRock released a new version of Rivality named Rivality v3. This version is still in a beta stage, but features all new graphics and design, improved gameplay, draggable bases and other features requested by the players.

Financing 
Rivality is financed through players purchasing in-game credits. These credits can be used to acquire VIP membership, in-game units and other advantages in the game.

Shut down 
Rivality shut down in August 2022.

References

External links 
 rivality.com international server
 Official FAQ
2008 video games
Android (operating system) games
Browser games
Massively multiplayer online real-time strategy games
Browser-based multiplayer online games
Video games developed in Sweden